Alexander Engelhardt may refer to:
Alexander Bogdanovich Engelhardt (1795–1859), Russian baron and general
Alexander Nikolayevich Engelhardt (1832–1893), Russian scholar and agriculturalist